Montluel is a commune in the Ain department in eastern France.

It is situated on the outskirts of Lyon. The inhabitants are known as Montluistes.

Population

Personalities 
 (1743-1818), Catholic Bishop of Quimper
André d'Arbelles (1767–1825), younger brother of the above, journalist and historiographer
Pierre-Dominique Ségaud (1784–1821), writer and lawyer
Joseph Crétin (1799-1857), Catholic Bishop of Saint Paul, Minnesota
Paul Magaud (1805-?), botanist
Jules Gros (1829–1891), journalist and President of the unrecognised Republic of Independent Guyana.
 (1924–1999), politician

See also
Communes of the Ain department

References

External links

 Montluel

Communes of Ain
 
Ain communes articles needing translation from French Wikipedia